This is a complete list of U.S. congressional committees (standing committees and select or special committees) that are operating in the United States Senate. Senators can be a member of more than one committee.

Standing committees
, there are 88 subsidiary bodies of the US Senate: 16 standing committees with 67 subcommittees, and five non-standing committees.

Non-standing committees
There are five non-standing, select, or special committees, which are treated similarly to standing committees.

Committee classes
Senate committees are divided, according to relative importance, into three categories: Class A, Class B, and Class C. In general, individual Senators are limited to service on two Class A committees and one Class B committee. Assignment to Class C committees is made without reference to a member's service on any other panels.

Standing committees
Standing committees are permanent bodies with specific responsibilities spelled out in the Senate's rules. Twelve of the sixteen current standing committees are Class A panels: Agriculture; Appropriations; Armed Services; Banking, Housing and Urban Affairs; Commerce, Science, and Transportation; Energy and Natural Resources; Environment and Public Works; Finance; Foreign Relations; Governmental Affairs; Judiciary; and Health, Education, Labor and Pensions. 

There are four Class B standing committees: Budget, Rules and Administration, Small Business, and Veterans' Affairs. There are currently no Class C standing committees.

Other, select and special committees
Other (i.e., Indian Affairs), select and special committees are ranked as Class B or Class C committees. They are created for clearly specified purposes. There are currently two Class B committees: the Select Committee on Intelligence and the Special Committee on Aging, and two Class C committees: the Select Committee on Indian Affairs and the Select Committee on Ethics.

Joint committees
Joint Committees are used for purposes of legislative and administrative coordination.  At present there are four: the Joint Economic Committee (Class B), the Joint Committee on the Library (Class C), the Joint Committee on Printing (Class C), and the Joint Committee on Taxation (Class C).

Jurisdiction
Standing committees in the Senate have their jurisdiction set by three primary sources: Senate Rules, ad hoc Senate Resolutions, and Senate Resolutions related to committee funding. To see an overview of the jurisdictions of standing committees in the Senate, see Standing Rules of the United States Senate, Rule XXV.

Party leadership 
Each party determines their committees leads, who serve as chair in the majority and ranking member in the minority. The table below lists the tenure of when each member was selected for their current term as committee lead. The Republican party rules stipulate that their leads of standing committees may serve no more than three congressional terms (two years each) as chair or ranking member, unless the full party conference grants them a waiver to do so. The current majority party is listed first for each committee.

See also 
List of United States House of Representatives committees
List of United States congressional joint committees
List of defunct United States congressional committees

References

External links
 (see also Biographical Directory of the United States Congress)

"Committees of the U.S. Congress". Congress.gov.

Committees